Leucotabanus is a genus of horse flies in the family Tabanidae.

Species
Leucotabanus albibasis (Brèthes, 1910)
Leucotabanus albovarius (Walker, 1854)
Leucotabanus ambiguus Stone, 1938
Leucotabanus annulatus (Say, 1823)
Leucotabanus aurarius Fairchild, 1953
Leucotabanus canithorax Fairchild, 1941
Leucotabanus cornelianus Fairchild, 1985
Leucotabanus exaestuans (Linnaeus, 1758)
Leucotabanus flavinotum (Kröber, 1934)
Leucotabanus itzarus (Bequaert, 1932)
Leucotabanus janinae Fairchild, 1970
Leucotabanus leucogaster Fairchild, 1951
Leucotabanus nigriventris Kröber, 1931
Leucotabanus pallidus Kröber, 1929
Leucotabanus pauculus Fairchild, 1951
Leucotabanus sebastianus Fairchild, 1941
Leucotabanus weyrauchi Fairchild, 1951

References

Tabanidae
Diptera of North America
Diptera of South America
Taxa named by Adolfo Lutz
Brachycera genera